Prosper Fernando was a longstanding announcer with Radio Ceylon, the oldest radio station in South Asia. Fernando presented some of Radio Ceylon's most popular radio programs such as Housewives' Choice and Holiday Choice. Thousands tuned into the programs on the island.

Fernando was a news reader, presenting the English news bulletins of Radio Ceylon. He was also an announcer on the Sinhala Service of the Sri Lanka Broadcasting Corporation.

See also
Radio Ceylon
Sri Lanka Broadcasting Corporation
List of Sri Lankan broadcasters

References

Bibliography 
 Wavell, Stuart. - The Art of Radio - Training Manual written by the Director Training of the CBC. - Ceylon Broadcasting Corporation, 1969.

External links
 SLBC-creating new waves of history
Eighty Years of Broadcasting in Sri Lanka
English Presenters over the then Radio Ceylon - Daily News, Colombo

Sri Lankan radio personalities